General Robertson may refer to:

Alexander Cunningham Robertson (1816–1884), British Army general
Beverly Robertson (1827–1910), Confederate States Army brigadier general
Brian Robertson, 1st Baron Robertson of Oakridge (1896–1974), British Army general
Charles T. Robertson Jr. (born 1946), U.S. Air Force general 
Donn J. Robertson (1916–2000), U.S. Marine Corps lieutenant general
Felix Huston Robertson (1839–1928), Confederate States Army brigadier general
Horace Robertson (1894–1960), Australian Army lieutenant general
Ian Robertson (British Army officer) (1913–2010), British Army major general
James Robertson (Australian Army officer) (1878–1951), Australian Army brigadier general
James Robertson (British Army officer) (1717–1788) was a British Army lieutenant general
Jerome B. Robertson (1815–1890), Confederate States Army brigadier general
Jim Robertson (British Army officer) (1910–2004), British Army major general
Philip Robertson (British Army officer) (1866–1936), British Army major general
Walter M. Robertson (1888–1954), U.S. Army major general
Sir William Robertson, 1st Baronet (1860–1933), British Army general

See also
Attorney General Robertson (disambiguation)